Born Arthur Hadrian Allcroft (1865 - 18 December 1929), he was a British classical scholar.  He was born in Ashby in Lincolnshire, and attended Magnus Grammar School and Exeter Grammar School before studying at Christ Church, Oxford.  His B.A was in Classics and Greats.  He was the author of Earthwork of England, described by E. Cecil Curwen as "a standard work of reference", and also wrote The Circle and the Cross, Downland Pathways, about the Sussex Downs, and Waters of Arun, which was published after he died.  He and his wife both died  on the same day, from throat infections.

References

Sources 

 

People from Lincolnshire
British classical scholars
Alumni of Christ Church, Oxford